Ozzy Wiesblatt (born March 9, 2002) is a Canadian professional ice hockey player for the San Jose Barracuda of the American Hockey League (AHL) as a prospect to the San Jose Sharks of the National Hockey League (NHL). He was drafted in the first round, 31st overall, by the Sharks in the 2020 NHL Entry Draft.

Early life
Wiesblatt was born to parents Kimberly White and Art Wiesblatt, who are both deaf. As a result, he and his siblings all learned American sign language to communicate. Wiesblatt and his brothers Ocean, Orca, and Oasiz all play hockey. They also have a younger sister, Oceania.

Playing career
Wiesblatt began his ice hockey career playing for the Calgary Bisons U15 AAA in the Alberta Major Bantam Hockey League before being drafted into the Western Hockey League (WHL). Prior to being drafted 25th overall, Wiesblatt recorded 38 goals and 35 assists in 32 games during the 2016–17 season. In spite of being drafted, he remained in the Alberta Midget Hockey League with the Calgary Bisons U18 team but was selected for Team Alberta at the 2017 WHL Cup. He made his WHL debut during the 2017–18 season, during which he recorded his first career WHL goal.

Wiesblatt officially joined the Raiders roster for the 2018–19 where he recorded 39 points and helped lead the team to the Ed Chynoweth Cup. As a result, he shared the team's Rookie of the Year award with Kaiden Guhle. This caught the attention of San Jose Sharks' general manager and director of scouting, who referred to Wiesblatt as a center rather than a winger. 

Wiesblatt entered his first year of draft eligibility ranking 19th overall North American skaters per the NHL Central Scouting Bureau's  Midterm Rankings. Although the season was shortened due to the COVID-19 pandemic in North America, he placed second on the team in scoring with 70 points in 64 games. As a result, he was drafted in the first round, 31st overall, by the San Jose Sharks in the 2020 NHL Entry Draft. He signed his contract on October 16, 2020.

Career statistics

Regular season and playoffs

International

References

External links

2002 births
Living people
Canadian ice hockey right wingers
Jewish ice hockey players
National Hockey League first-round draft picks
Prince Albert Raiders players
San Jose Barracuda players
San Jose Sharks draft picks
Ice hockey people from Calgary